"Ils sont tombés" is a song released in 1976, written by Charles Aznavour and Georges Garvarentz in 1975 and dedicated to the memory of Armenian genocide victims. It was subsequently released in English, as They Fell. The text has also been translated to Russian and Armenian (performed by Mirta Satdjian). The authorized Armenian translation is made by Fr. Raphael Antonian, Director of Murad-Rafaelian College in Sevres.

Notes

External links
 The status of Armenian communities living in the United States by M. Terzian (Songs history).
  
 
 

Works about the Armenian genocide
Charles Aznavour songs
1976 songs
Songs written by Charles Aznavour
Songs with music by Georges Garvarentz